The Castle Crag, also known as the Falling Mountain, is a mountain in the Central Highlands region of Tasmania, Australia. The mountain is part of the Du Cane Range and is situated within the Cradle Mountain-Lake St Clair National Park. The mountain is a major feature of the national park and is a popular venue with bush walkers and mountain climbers.

See also

 List of highest mountains of Tasmania

References

External links

 Parks Tasmania

Mountains of Tasmania
Central Highlands (Tasmania)
Cradle Mountain-Lake St Clair National Park